Sania Mirza and Mahesh Bhupathi were the defending champions, but withdrew before their first round match against Carly Gullickson and Bernard Tomic. They were replaced in the draw by Akgul Amanmuradova and Rik de Voest.

Cara Black and Leander Paes won the mixed doubles title at the 2010 Australian Open, defeating Ekaterina Makarova and Jaroslav Levinský in the final 7–5, 6–3.

Seeds

Draw

Finals

Top half

Bottom half

External links
 Main Draw
 2010 Australian Open – Doubles draws and results at the International Tennis Federation

Mixed Doubles
Australian Open (tennis) by year – Mixed doubles